Amblyseius anacardii is a species of mite in the family Phytoseiidae.

References

anacardii
Articles created by Qbugbot
Animals described in 1967